Marquis Roshe Walker (born July 6, 1972) is a former an American football cornerback. He was signed as an undrafted free agent by the St. Louis Rams in 1996. He played college football at Southeast Missouri State University.

Walker also played for the Washington Redskins, Oakland Raiders and Detroit Lions. His brother is Darnell Walker.

References

1972 births
Living people
American football cornerbacks
Detroit Lions players
Oakland Raiders players
Southeast Missouri State Redhawks football players
St. Louis Rams players
Washington Redskins players
Players of American football from St. Louis